= Daftar-khana-ye homayun =

The Daftar-khana-ye homayun was an administrative section managed by the daftardar (chief secretary) in Iran from the Safavid era until the early 20th century, when it was abolished by Reza Shah (r. 1925–1941).

== Sources ==
- Rajabzadeh, H. (2020). "Daftar-ḵāna-ye homāyūn". Encyclopaedia Iranica Online. Brill.
